Enos or Enosh (Hebrew: , Standard Enosh, Tiberian ʼĔnôš; "mortal man”) may refer to:

People in religious scripture
 Enos (biblical figure), a genealogical figure in the Bible.
 The Book of Enos, one of the books that make up the Book of Mormon
 Enos (Book of Mormon prophet), author of the Book of Enos

People

Single name
 Enosh (Nestorian patriarch), patriarch of the Church of the East between 877 and 884

Given name
 Enos Cabell, a baseball player
 Enos D. Hopping (1805–1847), U.S. Army general of the Mexican–American War
 Enos Stanley Kroenke, American businessman
 Enos McLeod, reggae singer and music producer
 Enos T. Throop, (1784-1874), Governor of NY State
 Enos Warren Persons (1836–1899), American politician
 Enos Slaughter (1916–2002), a baseball player

Surname
 Benjamin Enos (1788–1868), New York politician
 Elihu Enos (1824–1892), Wisconsin politician
 John Enos III, American actor
 Mireille Enos, American actress
 Roger Enos, military leader in Vermont
 Truman Enos (1777–1858), New York politician

Other
 Enos, Indiana, an unincorporated community
 Enos, Turkey, a town
 Enos (butterfly), a gossamer-winged butterfly genus
 Enos (chimpanzee), a chimpanzee who launched into space
 ENOS Rescue-System, an electronic rescue and locating system for use by divers at sea
 eNOS, the enzyme endothelial nitric oxide synthase
 Enos Strate, a character in the TV series The Dukes of Hazzard
 Enos (TV series), a spin-off series about the character
 Enos Fry, a fictional character in the animated TV series Futurama, originally the grandfather of Philip J. Fry

See also 
 Enes, male given name
 Eno (disambiguation)